Open is the twelfth album by Australian improvised music trio The Necks, first released on the Fish of Milk label in 2013 in Australia and on the ReR label internationally. 
 
Open is a return to the hour-long ambient improvisation of earlier albums which made The Necks famous.

Track listing
 "Open" - 68:05

All compositions by the Necks

Personnel
Chris Abrahams — piano, keyboards
Lloyd Swanton — bass
Tony Buck — drums, percussion

References

2013 albums
The Necks albums